Rough Draft Studios, Inc. is an American animation production studio based in Glendale, California, with a second studio in Glendale and its sister studio Rough Draft Korea located in Seoul, South Korea. The studio was founded in Van Nuys, Los Angeles, California by Gregg Vanzo in 1991.

Rough Draft Studios and its divisions have produced specials, commercials and direct-to-video work for companies such as Warner Bros. Animation, Cartoon Network Studios, 20th Television Animation, Nickelodeon Animation Studio, MTV Animation, Film Roman, and Disney Television Animation.

Founding 
Rough Draft Studios was founded in a Van Nuys, Los Angeles, California garage by Gregg and Nikki Vanzo. While working on The Ren & Stimpy Show, Nikki approached John Kricfalusi, creator of The Ren & Stimpy Show, about taking the animation to Korea. Nikki founded and runs Rough Draft Korea.

Growth in business 
After working on The Ren & Stimpy Show, many other shows requested the assistance of Rough Draft Korea in animation and ink & paint. In 1992, Rough Draft Studios had produced animation for its first feature film, FernGully: The Last Rainforest. In the same year, the studio began producing animation for The Simpsons and then for Beavis and Butt-Head in 1993. Also in 1993, Gregg's brother Scott Vanzo was brought on board. Rough Draft Korea quickly built a strong portfolio in the animation business with shows like their first series produced outside of South Korea The Maxx in 1995, which was nominated for an Annie Award. Claudia Katz, who had joined Rough Draft Studios in 1994 to produce The Maxx, and Rich Moore, joining in 1995 after having worked with Gregg on The Simpsons, completed the core of a Rough Draft Studios which would help "drive the cartoon boom of the late ‘90s". It was also in 1995 that Rough Draft Studios moved to Glendale, California, where they enjoyed their total success. Rough Draft would then later produce animation for shows like Futurama, Napoleon Dynamite, Sit Down, Shut Up, Drawn Together, Baby Blues, and Disenchantment, while its sister studio in South Korea would also produce animation for shows such as SpongeBob SquarePants, Amphibia, Dexter's Laboratory, The Powerpuff Girls, Samurai Jack, Phineas and Ferb, Rocko's Modern Life, The Angry Beavers, Star vs. the Forces of Evil, Family Guy, The Critic, Dilbert, Adventure Time, Sheep in the Big City, Dragon Tales, Gravity Falls, Steven Universe, The Owl House, and King of the Hill. Rough Draft and its divisions would also contribute to feature films based on the shows they worked on such as Beavis and Butt-Head Do America, The Powerpuff Girls Movie, The SpongeBob SquarePants Movie, The Simpsons Movie, and The SpongeBob Movie: Sponge Out of Water.

Technology
Rough Draft Studios is known for its blending of 2-D with computer animation, or non-photorealistic rendering which it first used on The Maxx and further utilized with Matt Groening's projects like Futurama, The Simpsons Movie and Disenchantment.

Filmography

Rough Draft Studios
Most projects produced by Rough Draft Studios, Inc. in Glendale, California are also animated overseas by Rough Draft Korea Co., Ltd. in Seoul, South Korea.

TV series

Films/specials

Other 
The Simpsons - "Deep, Deep Trouble" music video (overseas animation provided by Anivision)
MADtv - Spy vs. Spy shorts (produced for Klasky Csupo)
2003 Wendy's "Go Wild" commercial starring the Looney Tunes characters, promoting Looney Tunes: Back in Action
59th Primetime Emmy Awards - Brian and Stewie Griffin opening number
Gravity Falls - "Weirdmageddon 3: Take Back The Falls" (ShackTron CG animation)
Futurama: Worlds of Tomorrow
DuckTales - "Moonvasion!" (additional animation)

Rough Draft Korea 
Rough Draft Korea, RDS' sister studio based in Seoul, South Korea, has produced animation for the following series, features and specials:

TV series

Films/specials

Notes

References

External links

 
  

 
1991 establishments in California
Adult animation studios
American companies established in 1991
American animation studios
Companies based in Glendale, California
Companies based in Seoul
Entertainment companies of South Korea
Entertainment companies of the United States
Mass media companies established in 1991
Privately held companies based in California
South Korean animation studios